David Homyk (born in Canada) is an American singer-songwriter, record producer, actor, model, and television personality.

Early life and education
Homyk graduated with honors from The University of Virginia earning two bachelor's degrees, one in economics and one in philosophy, and was consistently on the Dean's List.

Career 
Homyk has made recordings for many well-known artists, including Beyoncé Knowles and her sister Solange. He tours and performs regularly, having shared stages with artists ranging from American Idol's Constantine Maroulis to the hip-hop legend & Hall of Fame inductee, Doug E. Fresh. David's debut album is called True Story. On June 27, 2013, AOL hired David as its first live anchor. He was given the job on singing the morning news.

Homyk appears on the daytime soap opera, All My Children, and has made several appearances on both The Tyra Banks Show and on Sex and the City. He has also modeled in many campaigns for clothing companies such as Club Monaco and Burlington Coat Factory, and has appeared in many commercial print advertisements. He was the first commercial model for the familiar fruit juice drink, Capri Sun, and appears in commercial spots for Anheuser-Busch as the official mixologist for the popular beverage, Bud Light Lime.

He was also a contestant on the first season of Genuine Ken, and on the eighth season of The Bachelorette.

References

External links 
 David Homyk

Living people
Canadian emigrants to the United States
University of Virginia alumni
American male composers
21st-century American composers
American male pop singers
American male singer-songwriters
American singer-songwriters
American rock guitarists
American male guitarists
American pop pianists
American male pianists
American pop rock singers
American tenors
American multi-instrumentalists
American male soap opera actors
American environmentalists
1979 births
Bachelor Nation contestants
21st-century American singers
21st-century American pianists
21st-century American guitarists
21st-century American male singers